Byw or BYW may refer to

Backyard wrestling, an underground hobby and sport of a style similar to professional-style wrestling.
Baptist Young Women, a project of the Woman's Missionary Union
Belhare language, a Sino-Tibetan language spoken in Nepal (iso-639-3 code: byw)
Blakely Island Airport, Blakely Island, Washington, United States (IATA code: BYW)
Brockley Whins Metro station, South Tyneside, England (station code: BYW)
Byw, a 2004 EP by Welsh band Anweledig 
Backyard Worlds, a volunteer project searching for brown dwarfs and the hypothetical Planet Nine.